The Terminators is a 2009 American science fiction film directed by Xavier S. Puslowski, starring Jeremy London, A Martinez, Paul Logan, and produced by The Asylum. As a mockbuster, it was released one month prior to the premiere of the fourth film in the Terminator franchise, Terminator Salvation.

Plot
The film takes place at an undetermined point in the future, when humanity has developed advanced robotic technology with enhanced artificial intelligence. This includes the use of cybernetic organisms (or cyborgs) called the TR-4 (all TR-4s are played by Paul Logan) for general labor. After being reprogrammed by the newest model TR-5, the machines instigate a cybernetic revolt against humanity, bombing cities and sending thousands of armed, identical TR-4 androids to eradicate all human life.

A band of survivors, led by small-town Sheriff Reed (A Martinez), battle to make it through and defeat the TR-4s. During their journey, they encounter a mysterious man, Kurt Ross (Jeremy London) who possesses a weapon that can disable any TR-4 it hits. Ross also has intimate knowledge of the TR-4s and is heavily implied to have met Reed in the past. With Ross's help, Reed's group struggles through several battles with the TR-4s and ultimately locate an airship used by the machines to travel. Ross proposes that they travel to the space station where the TR-4s originate from and shut them down remotely, but they must first acquire fuel for the ship. They find the fuel, but Sheriff Reed is shot in the leg by a TR-4.

On the ship, the survivors discover metal beneath Reed's skin, causing him to begin questioning his existence. Ross reveals that Reed is actually one of the first TR-5s, planted in the community with Ross as his handler. Reed's memories are all implants based on Ross's own memories. Bronson (Dustin Harnish) becomes paranoid and believes the other survivors are also androids, but Chloe (Lauren Walsh) persuades him by revealing she is pregnant. At the space station, the group battles the TR-4s en masse, resulting in Bronson's death and Tiffany (Lucinda Rogers)  becoming separated from the others. Ross attempts to shut down the TR-4s but the control console fights back, repeatedly locking him out. Suddenly, the TR-4s all shut down, and Ross ominously realizes their power is being funneled to a much worse problem – the giant TR-5 that caused the rebellion in the first place. The massive robot appears and kills Ross with a blade mounted in its arm after shrugging off his EMP weapon, then attacks Chloe. Reed appears and baits the TR-5 into an airlock, and Chloe ejects both it and Reed into outer space. The TR-4s come back to life despite Tiffany hitting the shutdown switch, but when she rips the cords from the control box, they all die simultaneously. Chloe, Tiffany, Tanner (Mark Hengst), Laura (Krystle Connor) and Chloe's unborn child are left as the only survivors, possibly of all humanity.

Cast
Jeremy London as  Kurt Ross 
A Martinez as Sheriff Reed Carpenter 
Paul Logan as TR-4 
Lauren Walsh as Chloe 
Sara Tomko as Pallas 
Dustin Harnish as Bronson 
Clint Browning as Chuck 
Lucinda Rogers as Tiffany 
Mark Hengst as Tanner  
Krystle Connor as Laura
Gary Miller-Youst as Sam (as Gary Youst) 
Joel Hebner as Anson (as Joel E. Hebner) 
Naómi Hurter as Paige (as Naomi Hurter) 
Russell Reynolds as Captain Engineer (as G. Russell Reynolds) 
Stephen Blackehart as Logan 
Jason S. Gray as Lipinski

References

External links
 
 The Terminators at The Asylum

2009 independent films
2009 science fiction films
2009 films
2009 direct-to-video films
American robot films
American science fiction films
The Asylum films
Mockbuster films
Films set in San Diego
Films set in the future
Direct-to-video science fiction films
American dystopian films
Android (robot) films
Films directed by Xavier S. Puslowski
Films about artificial intelligence
Apocalyptic films
2000s English-language films
2000s American films